Crucilobiceras is an ammonoid cephalopod genus from the Lower Jurassic belonging to the eoderoceratoidean family Eoderoceratidae.  Cruciliboceras has an evolute shell, such that all whorls are well exposed, with  persistent radial ribbing and with spines or tubercles on the outer, ventral, rim, and in some, tubercles in the inner, umbilical, rim. The genus Crucilobiceras is commonly found along the Jurassic Coast of England.

Metaderoceras, named by Leonard Spath in 1925, is a jr. synonym for Crucilobiceras named by S.S. Buckman in 1920 according to Arkell et al., in the Treatise on Invertebrate Paleontology (1957).

References
Notes

Bibliography
Arkell et al., 1957. Mesozoic Ammonoidea, in Treatise on Invertebrate Paleontology, (Part L); Geological Soc. of America and University of Kansas press
Donovan, Callomon and Howarth 1981 Classification of the Jurassic Ammonitina; Systematics Association. 

Early Jurassic ammonites of Europe
Ammonites of Europe
Fossil taxa described in 1920
Ammonitida genera
Eoderoceratoidea